Seven ships of the Royal Navy have borne the name HMS Strombolo, or HMS Stromboli, after the volcano Stromboli, in Italy:

  was an 8-gun fireship launched in 1691, rebuilt in 1704 and sold in 1713.
  was an 8-gun fireship, formerly the civilian Mollineaux. She was purchased in 1739 and sold in 1743.
  was an 8-gun fireship, formerly the civilian Owner's Goodwill. She was purchased in 1756 and sold in 1768.
 HMS Strombolo was a fireship, launched in 1746 as the 14-gun sloop . She was converted to a fireship and renamed Strombolo in 1775 and was hulked in 1780.
 HMS Strombolo (1797?) was a purchased gunboat based at Gibraltar that the Spanish sank during the action of 19 January 1799.
  was an 8-gun bomb vessel, launched in 1795 at North Shields as the mercantile Leander. The Royal Navy purchased her in 1797, converted her to a bomb-vessel, and renamed her. She participated in the capture of Malta in 1800. The Navy laid her up in 1802 and had her broken up in 1809. 
 HMS Strombolo was a bomb vessel, formerly the 14-gun sloop HMS Autumn, the merchantman Autumn, launched at Shields in 1800 and purchased in 1801. She was converted to a bomb vessel and renamed Strombolo in 1811; she was sold in 1815. She returned to mercantile service but was lost in 1817.
  was a wooden paddle sloop launched in 1839 and sold in 1866.

See also
  (or Stromboli) was a ketch launched in 1793 at the Bombay Dockyard for the Bombay Marine. She foundered on 18 September or 15 October 1809.

Notes and citations
Notes

Citations

References
 
 

Royal Navy ship names